Forecast or derived words may refer to:

Prediction and models 
 Forecasting, the process of making statements about events which have not yet been observed
 Weather forecasting, the application of science and technology to predict the weather
 FORECAST (model), system for managing ecosystems and forest growth

Music 
 The Forecast, an indie rock band from Peoria, Illinois
 Forecast (album), a 1993 album by 808 State
 Forecast: Tomorrow, a 2006 compilation album by the jazz group Weather Report
 "Forecast (Intro)", a song by Amerie from Because I Love It
 "Forecast" (song), a song by Jeff Lynne
 The Forecast (album), the debut album and third release by Australian band In Fiction

Other uses 
 Mount Forecast
 Tommy Forecast (born 1986), English professional footballer

See also 
 
 
 
 
 Forecast model (disambiguation)
 Foresight (disambiguation)
 The Forecaster, a regional newspaper in southern Maine
 The Forecaster, a 2014 documentary about Martin A. Armstrong